State Route 25 (SR 25) is a  east–west state highway in northern Middle Tennessee.

Route description

SR 25 begins as a secondary highway in Robertson County in Barren Plains at an intersection with SR 161, and goes east to an intersection with US 431/SR 65 just north of Springfield. It continues east through rural unincorporated Robertson County, near Cross Plains, to intersect and have a short concurrency with SR 49, before separating and continuing east, becoming a primary highway. It then goes through the middle of Cross Plains and continues east to intersect I-65. About  later, it intersects US 31W/SR 41 and enters Sumner County.

It then comes to an intersection with SR 76 just south of New Deal. It continues through Cottontown to Gallatin to intersect with SR 109. It continues into downtown Gallatin to intersect and run concurrently with SR 174/SR 386. A short distance later, it intersects US 31E/SR 6, where SR 386 ends and SR 174 separated and continues north along US 31E/SR 6 into downtown, while SR 25 continues east. It continues through Castalian Springs and enters Trousedale County.

A short distance from the county line, it intersects US 231 and SR 10, with SR 10 running concurrently with SR 25 to Hartsville. Continuing east, it enters Hartsville and intersects SR 141, runs concurrent for a short distance, then separates and turns south, while SR 25/SR 10 continue east. Just outside of Hartsville, SR 10 separates and turns north, while SR 25 continues its eastward trek, and crosses into Smith County shortly afterwards. Just before the county line, SR 25 passes just north of the abandoned Hartsville Nuclear Plant.

After crossing into Smith County, it passes through Dixon Springs. It then continues east to Riddleton, and then to Carthage, where it intersects SR 80. Continuing into Carthage, it intersects with SR 263, providing access to downtown. It then curves to the south and crosses the Cumberland River and enters South Carthage. It then ends at US 70N/SR 24/SR 53 in South Carthage.

Future
Currently, a project to modify the intersection with SR 49 east of Springfield is underway. The project is projected to be completed by the end of 2021.

Major intersections

References

025
025
025
025
025

External links